The International Ball game Confederation (also known as CIJB, in French Confederation Internationale du Jeu de Balle), founded on May 13, 1928, is the organization that manages the common activities of the many ball games deriving from Jeu de paume.

Argentina, Belgium, Colombia, Ecuador, France, Italy, Mexico, Netherlands, Spain, England, and Uruguay all have local federations that take part in the CIJB.

Since every country has developed minor changes, the CIJB created a variety called International game that shares all the common traits of the direct style (face to face) and another variety for the indirect style, International fronton. The CIJB also manages the Handball International Championships, splitting them into two games: the European Championship and the International Championship.

Members 
 Argentina - Agrupación Argentina de Pelota a Mano 
 Belgium - Fédération royale nationale de balle pelote / Koninklijke nationale kaatsbond 
 Colombia - Federación Colombiana de Pelota
 Ecuador - Asociación de Pelota Nacional
 England - England Handball Association
 France - Fédération française de Jeu de Paume
 Italy - Federazione Italiana Pallapugno
 Mexico - Federación Mexicana de Juegos y Deportes Autóctonos y Tradicionales
 Netherlands - Koninklijke Nationale Kaats Bond
 Spain (as Valencian Pilota Federation) - Federació de Pilota Valenciana
 Uruguay - Federación Uruguaya de Pelota

See also 
 Jeu de paume
 Ballepelote
 Chazas
 Frisian handball
 Longue paume
 Pallone
 Pelota tarasca
 Valencian pilota
 Llargues
 International game
 Handball International Championships

References

External links 
 International Ball game Confederation

Handball sports
International sports organizations